Libertas Academica (LA) is an open access academic journal publisher specializing in the biological sciences and clinical medicine. It was acquired by SAGE Publications in September 2016.

Background 
Libertas Academica is a publisher of open access ("OA") scientific, technical and medical journals. It is privately funded and was founded specifically to publish OA journals. It was established in late 2004 with the launch of two journals, Evolutionary Bioinformatics and Cancer Informatics. Additional journals have been published since. It was included on a list of "predatory" open access publishers in 2010 but later removed. In 2013, a sham study reporting that a compound isolated from lichen can kill cancer cells was submitted to one of the journals published by Libertas for peer review. After review, the sham study was correctly rejected for publication.

Journal indexing and archiving 
As articles become suitable, indexing on DOAJ, PubMed, and MEDLINE is sought for all journals, as is archiving in PubMed Central. Articles also appear on indexes and repositories, including OAIster and Pubget. The publisher offers an Open Archives Initiative Protocol for Metadata Harvesting.

Green and Gold OA 
SHERPA/RoMEO has identified LA as a Green OA publisher. This means that authors are permitted to archive their work prior to and after publication. LA is also a gold OA publisher because all articles are freely available online immediately upon publication.

Copyright 
All articles, including meta-data and supplementary files, are published under the Creative Commons Attribution license (often referred to as the "CC-BY" license). This means that:
Licensees may copy, distribute, display and perform the work and make derivative works based on it only if they give the author or licensor the credits in the manner specified by these.

All journals fully indexed by DOAJ have been awarded the SPARC Europe Seal owing to the use of this copyright policy.

Subject home pages 
Pages containing the most recent papers published in the entire set of journals are available for some subjects, including   bioinformatics, biology, biomarkers, cancer, chemistry, drugs & therapeutics, genes & therapeutics, and medicine.

References

External links
 
 Latest News Blog

Academic publishing companies
Publishing companies established in 2004
Open access publishers